Miaopai is a Chinese video sharing and live streaming service with 70 million daily active users.

References

External links
 

Android (operating system) software
IOS software
Video software
Chinese social networking websites
Video hosting